Sam Rappaport may refer to:

 Samuel Rappaport (1932–2016), Democratic member of the Pennsylvania House of Representatives
 Sam Rappaport (One Life to Live), a character from the American soap opera One Life to Live